is a trans-Neptunian object, both considered a scattered and detached object, located in the outermost region of the Solar System. It was first observed on 24 May 2015, by astronomers at the Mauna Kea Observatories in Hawaii, United States.

Orbit and classification 

 orbits the Sun at a distance of 49.3–61.5 AU once every 412 years and 4 months (150,600 days; semi-major axis of 55.4 AU). Its orbit has an eccentricity of 0.11 and an inclination of 24° with respect to the ecliptic.

With an orbital period of 412 years, it seems to be a resonant trans-Neptunian objects in a 2:5 resonance with Neptune, as several other objects, but with a lower eccentricity (0.11 instead of more than 0.60) and higher perihelia (at 49.3 AU rather than 31–41 AU).

Considered both a scattered and detached object,  is particularly unusual as it has an unusually circular orbit for a scattered-disc object (SDO). Although it is thought that traditional scattered-disc objects have been ejected into their current orbits by gravitational interactions with Neptune, the low eccentricity of its orbit and the distance of its perihelion (SDOs generally have highly eccentric orbits and perihelia less than 38 AU) seems hard to reconcile with such celestial mechanics. This has led to some uncertainty as to the current theoretical understanding of the outer Solar System. The theories include close stellar passages, unseen planet/rogue planets/planetary embryos in the early Kuiper belt, and resonance interaction with an outward-migrating Neptune. The Kozai mechanism is capable of transferring orbital eccentricity to a higher inclination. It is in a 5:2 resonance to Neptune.

Physical characteristics 

Johnston's archive estimates a diameter of 154 kilometers based on an assumed albedo of 0.09.

References

External links 
 List Of Centaurs and Scattered-Disk Objects, Minor Planet Center
 List of Known Trans-Neptunian Objects, Johnston's Archive
 
 

Minor planet object articles (unnumbered)

20150524
Trans-Neptunian objects in a 2:5 resonance